The Military Medical Academy (abbr. VMA), is a military hospital center in the Banjica neighborhood of Belgrade, Serbia.

Founded in 1844, it is a part of the Serbian Ministry of Defence and is generally intended to serve the personnel of the Serbian Armed Forces and Ministry of Defence, although it is open for civilians as well. It is known for its high standard in medical practice and is generally considered to be among the best medical institution in the country. In 2011, Medical School of Military Medical Academy is formed as part of the newly-established University of Defence.

History
The Military Medical Academy was founded on 2 March 1844. On that day, Prince Alexander Karađorđević signed a decree establishing the first "Central Military Hospital" on the foundations of the military hospital in Belgrade.

In 1909 began the construction of a new building of the "General Military Hospital". with 400 beds available, in Vračar. It was planned to be the most advanced hospital in the Balkans.

The hospital, changed its name once again into the "Main Military Hospital" in 1930. It operated under the Health Department of the Defence Ministry of the Kingdom of Yugoslavia.

In 1949, the hospital was renamed to the "Military Medical Academy", the name it bears to this date. In 1960, the Parliament of Yugoslavia passed an "Act on the Military Medical Academy as the top military medical, educational and medical research institution", which further contoured its supreme status in health system of Serbia and then Yugoslavia.

In 1982, after five years of construction, the Military Medical Academy moved into new medical complex, one of the largest in Europe and the largest single hospital edifice in Serbia.

In 2007, under the agreement between the Ministry of Defence and the Ministry of Health, the Military Medical Academy was functionally integrated into the national health system thus providing health care to civilians also. 

In 2011, the Military Medical Academy became integral part of newly established University of Defence, together with Military Academy.

Annually, with 1,200 beds available, about 35,000 patients are hospitalized, about 20,000 surgical interventions are made and more than half a million specialist examinations are performed.

Building

It was designed by the award-winning architects Colonel Josip Osojnik and Slobodan Nikolić. Their project won the competition in 1973. The construction was finished in 1981 and the hospital officially moved into a new building and began operations on 1 January 1982.

The hospital building itself is a 14-story building covering 180,000 square meters of space and divided in more than 60 different technical-technological units, which makes it the biggest single hospital edifice in Serbia.

Awards and recognitions
The Military Medical Academy bears many decorations, awards, recognitions and letters of thanks of which the most significant are the following:
Awards
 Order of St. Sava, first order
 Order of Brotherhood and Unity with the gold wreath granted by the Presidency of Yugoslavia (1990)
 Medal of Republika Srpska (1993)
 Medal of Nikola Tesla, first order
 Medal of Republika Srpska sash (2013)
 Order of Karađorđe's Star, third order (2014)

Recognitions
 Superbrand of Serbia in the Health & Beauty domain (2007)
 The Best of Serbia award by the Economy Chamber of the Republic of Serbia
 The Best Corporative Brand in the field of medicine and health care by the Economic Review and the Ministry of Trade and Services
 "22nd December" prize for architecture of the hospital complex

Chiefs

See also
 Healthcare in Serbia
 List of hospitals in Serbia

References

External links

 

Hospital buildings completed in 1981
Military hospitals in Serbia
Military academies of Serbia
University of Defence
Organizations based in Belgrade
Hospitals established in 1884
Recipients of the Order of St. Sava
Savski Venac